Prajna or Prajñā  may refer to:

 Prajñā (Hinduism), a Hindu concept
 Prajñā (Buddhism), a Buddhist concept
 Prajna (Buddhist monk), an important 9th century Buddhist monk from Gandhara

See also
 Prajnaparamita, a Buddhist concept